
Gmina Laskowa is a rural gmina (administrative district) in Limanowa County, Lesser Poland Voivodeship, in southern Poland.

Villages
Gmina Laskowa contains the villages and settlements of Jaworzna, Kamionka Mała, Kobyłczyna, Krosna, Laskowa, Sechna, Strzeszyce, Ujanowice and Żmiąca.

Neighbouring gminas
Gmina Laskowa is bordered by the gminas of Iwkowa, Limanowa, Lipnica Murowana, Łososina Dolna and Żegocina.

References
Polish official population figures 2006

Laskowa
Limanowa County